St Dwywe’s Church is a Grade II* listed church in Llanddwywe, Gwynedd, North Wales.

It has a curvilinear churchyard and farm buildings on its west. Its structure, of rubble stone construction, is mainly of late medieval and early modern date, the church having first been mentioned in documents dating to 1292–1293.

It is named for Saint Dwywe ferch Gwallog, a pre-congregational saint of Wales born between 465 and 585, who was reported to be the wife of  Saint Dynod Bwr and mother of Saint Deiniol and possibly of Cynwyl, Gwarthan, and Aneirin.

References

Grade II* listed churches in Gwynedd